This is a list of book lists (bibliographies) on Wikipedia, organized by various criteria.

General lists

 List of 18th-century British children's literature titles
 List of 19th-century British children's literature titles
 List of American children's books
 List of Australian crime-related books and media
 List of anonymously published works
 List of autobiographies
 Lists of banned books
 List of books written by children or teenagers
 List of book titles taken from literature
 List of books by year of publication
 List of children's books made into feature films
 List of Christian novels
 List of comic books
 Lists of dictionaries
 Lists of encyclopedias
 List of fantasy novels
 List of gay male teen novels
 List of Glagolitic books
 List of historical novels
 List of Hollywood novels
 List of light novels
 List of novels based on comics
 List of poetry collections
 List of science fiction novels
 List of unpublished books by notable authors

Selective lists

 20th Century's Greatest Hits: 100 English-Language Books of Fiction
 Best-selling books
 Big Read
 Bokklubben World Library 
 Children's classic books
 Great Books of the Western World
 Harvard Classics
 [[Le Monde's 100 Books of the Century|Le Monde'''s 100 Books of the Century]]
 Literary Taste: How to Form It Major English dictionaries
 Modern Library's 100 Best Novels
 Most expensive books and manuscripts
 Ninety-Nine Novels The Top 100 Crime Novels of All TimeSubject lists

 Bibliography of advertising
 List of books about anarchism
 List of books with anti-war themes
 List of books about ballroom dancing
 List of books about business
 Bibliography of classical guitar
 Bibliography of Colditz Castle
 Bibliography of conservatism in the United States
 Bibliography of cricket
 Books on cryptography
 Bibliography of Danish architecture
 Bibliography of encyclopedias
 Bibliography of encyclopedias: architecture and architects
 Bibliography of encyclopedias: art and artists
 Bibliography of encyclopedias: astronomy and astronomers
 Bibliography of encyclopedias: aviation
 Bibliography of encyclopedias: biology
 Bibliography of encyclopedias: business, information and economics
 Bibliography of encyclopedias: cuisine
 Bibliography of encyclopedias: film, radio, television and mass communications
 Bibliography of encyclopedias: general biographies
 Bibliography of encyclopedias: geography
 Bibliography of encyclopedias: history
 Bibliography of encyclopedias: literature
 Bibliography of encyclopedias: religion
 Bibliography of Fannie Mae and Freddie Mac
 Bibliography of film by genre
 Bibliography of film: documentary
 Bibliography of film: film noir
 Bibliography of film: horror
 Bibliography of fly fishing
 Bibliography of fly fishing (fly tying, stories, fiction)
 Bibliography of fly fishing (species related)
 List of books about folklore
 Bibliography of Halloween
 Bibliography of Hindi cinema
 List of books and publications related to the hippie subculture
 Bibliography of Irish rail transport
 Bibliography of jazz
 Bibliography of law
 Bibliography of Music Literature
 List of books about mythology
 List of books about negotiation
 Psychedelic literature
 Bibliography of roller derby
 Bibliography of the Sangh Parivar
 List of books on self-help
 List of books about skepticism
 List of books about the skinhead subculture
 Bibliography of suburbs
 Bibliography of tourism
 List of books about video games
 Bibliography of Wikipedia

 History 

 Bibliography of 18th–19th century Royal Naval history
 List of archaeology and history books
 Bibliography of the Arab–Israeli conflict
 Bibliography of Australian history
 Bibliography of British and Irish History
 Bibliography of Chinese history
 Bibliography of The Holocaust
 Bibliography of Japanese history
 Bibliography of the history of Lyon
 Bibliography of New Zealand history
 Bibliography of the Ottoman Empire
 Bibliography of the Rwandan genocide
 Bibliography of the War in Darfur
 Bibliography of World War I
 Bibliography of World War II
History of North America
 Bibliography of Canadian history
 Bibliography of Alberta history
 Bibliography of the 1837–38 insurrections in Lower Canada
 Bibliography of Canadian military history
 Bibliography of the Front de libération du Québec
 Bibliography of Saskatchewan history
 Bibliography of Chicago history
 Bibliography of Idaho history
 Bibliography of the Kent State shootings
 Bibliography of the Lewis and Clark Expedition 
 Bibliography of Midwestern history
 Bibliography of Montana history
 Bibliography of North Dakota history
 Bibliography of Oregon history
 Bibliography of the Reconstruction Era
 Bibliography of the Republican Party 
 Bibliography of South Dakota history
Bibliography of United States military history
 Bibliography of the American Civil War
 Bibliography of American Civil War Confederate military unit histories
 Bibliography of American Civil War Union military unit histories
 Bibliography of American Civil War battles and campaigns
 Bibliography of American Civil War homefront
 Bibliography of American Civil War military leaders
 Bibliography of the American Revolutionary War 
 Bibliography of early U.S. naval history
 Bibliography of the War of 1812
 Bibliography of Wyoming history

 People 

 People in general 

 Bibliography of the Ainu
 Bibliography of African women
 Bibliography of Nigerian women
 Bibliography of Duwamish (tribe)
 Bibliography of the Western Apache

 List of autobiographies
 List of political career biographies
 List of American political memoirs
 List of Australian political memoirs
 List of British political memoirs
 List of books about prime ministers of Canada

 Specific persons 

 Bibliography of Apocalypse
 List of books about King Arthur
 Bibliography of James Bond
 Bibliography of Subhas Chandra Bose
 Bibliography of George H. W. Bush
 Bibliography of George W. Bush
 Bibliography of Jimmy Carter
 Bibliography of Whittaker Chambers
 Bibliography of Hillary Clinton
 List of books about Leonard Cohen
 Bibliography of works on Davy Crockett
 Bibliography of André Gide
 Bibliography of Ulysses S. Grant
 Bibliography of works on Che Guevara
 List of books about Adolf Hitler
 Bibliography of Wolfgang Hohlbein
 List of books about John Howard
 List of books about Allama Iqbal
 Bibliography of Thomas Jefferson
 List of books about Jesus
 Bibliography of Andrew Johnson
 Bibliography of Lyndon B. Johnson
 Bibliography of Kiss
 Bibliography of Abraham Lincoln
 Bibliography of works on Madonna
 Biographies of Karl Marx
 Bibliography of William McKinley
 Bibliography of works on Adolfas Mekas
 List of books about Muhammed
 Bibliography of Napoleon
 Bibliography of Richard Nixon
 Bibliography of Barack Obama
 Bibliography of Yasujirō Ozu
 Bibliography of Louis-Joseph Papineau
 Bibliography of Barbara Park
 Bibliography of C. Northcote Parkinson
 Bibliography of Pope Pius XII
 Bibliography of Carlo Pollonera
 Bibliography of Ramakrishna
 Bibliography of Ayn Rand and Objectivism
 Bibliography of Ronald Reagan
 Bibliography of Jane Roberts
 Bibliography of William Howard Taft
 Bibliography of Harry S. Truman
 Bibliography of Donald Trump
 Bibliography of Swami Vivekananda
 Bibliography of George Washington

 Regions and places 

 Bibliography of Abkhazia
 Bibliography of Afghanistan
 Bibliography of the Ainu
 Bibliography of the Åland Islands
 Bibliography of Albania
 Bibliography of American Samoa
 Bibliography of Amsterdam
 Bibliography of Andorra
 Bibliography of Angola
 Bibliography of Anguilla
 Bibliography of Antarctica
 Bibliography of Antigua and Barbuda
 Aran Islands bibliography
 Bibliography of Aruba
 Bibliography of the Bahamas
 Bibliography of Bangalore
 Bibliography of Bhutan
 Bibliography of Boston
 Bibliography of British Columbia
 Bibliography of Canada
 Bibliography of Canadian provinces and territories
 Bibliography of Colorado
 Bibliography of Copenhagen
 Bibliography of Finland
 Bibliography of Ganges
 List of books about Nazi Germany
 Bibliography of Ghana
 Bibliography of Gibraltar
 Bibliography of Glacier National Park
 Bibliography of Greece
 Bibliography of Guadeloupe
 Bibliography of Guangzhou
 Bibliography of Guatemala
 Bibliography of Guernsey
 Bibliography of India
 Bibliography of Jersey
 List of books about Korea
 Bibliography of Los Angeles
 Bibliography of Martinique
 Bibliography of Montserrat
 Bibliography of Mount Rainier National Park
 Bibliography of New Brunswick
 Bibliography of New Caledonia
 Bibliography of New York (state)
 Bibliography of Nicaragua
 Bibliography of Niue
 Bibliography of Norfolk Island
 Bibliography of Nova Scotia
 Bibliography of Ontario
 Bibliography of the Ottoman Empire
 List of books about Oxford
 Bibliography of Pakistan
 Bibliography of Paraguay
 Bibliography of Paris
 Bibliography of Philadelphia
 Bibliography of the Pitcairn Islands
 Bibliography of Punjab
 Bibliography of Rivers State
 Bibliography of Saint Helena, Ascension and Tristan da Cunha
 Bibliography of the Sierra Nevada
 Bibliography of Singapore
 Bibliography of South Georgia and the South Sandwich Islands
 Bibliography of Sri Lanka
 Bibliography of the Turks and Caicos Islands
 Bibliography of the United States Virgin Islands
 Bibliography of Uruguay
 Bibliography of the Vale of Glamorgan
 Bibliography of Varanasi
 Bibliography of Wake Island
 Bibliography of Western Sahara
 Bibliography of Yellowstone National Park

 Religion 

 Bibliography of Black theology
 List of Chinese Hymn Books
 Bibliography of Christadelphians
 List of Christian apologetic works
 Bibliography of Christianity in China
 Bibliography of Eastern Orthodoxy in the United States
 Bibliography of works on the Jehovah's Witnesses
 Bibliography of Opus Dei
 Bibliography of Prem Rawat and related organizations
 Bibliography of Scientology
 List of Shia books
 List of Sunni books
 Bibliography of books critical of Christianity
 Bibliography of books critical of Islam
 Bibliography of encyclopedias: religion
 Bibliography of justification (theology)
 List of books about mythology
 List of books of religious apologetics

Science

 Bibliography of Aeolian Research
 Bibliography of anthropology
 Bibliography of astronomy and astronomers
 Bibliography of biology
 Bibliography of biology (encyclopedias)
 Bibliography of code-switching
 List of books in computational geometry
 Bibliography of ecology 
 List of textbooks in electromagnetism
 List of books about energy issues
 List of environmental books
 List of evolution books
 List of textbooks on classical mechanics and quantum mechanics
 List of medical textbooks
 List of books about mushrooms
 List of books about neuro-linguistic programming
 List of books about nuclear issues
 Bibliography of popular physics concepts
 Bibliography of science and technology in Canada
 Bibliography of sociology
 Bibliography of sustainability
 List of textbooks in thermodynamics and statistical mechanics

Writer lists

 List of works by Piers Anthony
 List of books by Isaac Asimov
 List of works by W. H. Auden
 List of books by Hilaire Belloc
 List of books by Mary Berry
 List of books by Enid Blyton
 List of works by Jorge Luis Borges
 List of works by Ray Bradbury
 List of books by Frank Macfarlane Burnet
 List of books by Barbara Cartland
 List of books by G. K. Chesterton
 List of books by Agatha Christie
 List of books by Jacques Derrida
 List of works by Neil Gaiman
 List of books by William Gibson
 List of books by Graham Greene
 List of books by Clive Hamilton
 List of books by Friedrich Hayek
 List of works by Søren Kierkegaard
 List of works by Stephen King
 List of books by Astrid Lindgren
 List of works by H. P. Lovecraft
 List of books by Amory Lovins
 List of books by Martin Luther
 List of books by Madonna
 List of books by Thomas Hunt Morgan
 List of works by Robert Morrison
 List of works by Vladimir Nabokov
 List of works by John Neal
 List of books by Andre Norton
 List of Dr. Seuss books
 List of works by Pierre Schaeffer
 List of works by Clark Ashton Smith
 List of books by J. R. R. Tolkien
 List of works by Leo Tolstoy
 List of works by Kurt Vonnegut
 List of books by Max Weber
 List of books by H. G. Wells
 List of books by P. G. Wodehouse

Series lists

 List of Angel books
 List of Animorphs books
 List of The Baby-sitters Club books
 List of Beechwood Bunny Tales books
 List of Berenstain Bears books
 List of Biggles books
 List of Boxcar Children books
 List of Buffy the Vampire Slayer books
 List of Care Bears books
 List of Charmed books
 List of Conflict of the Ages books
 List of Cyberpunk 2020 books
 List of Darkover books
 List of Doc Savage novels
 Lists of Doctor Who books
 List of Flight 29 Down books
 List of FoxTrot books
 List of Ghost Stations books
 List of Goosebumps books
 List of GURPS books
 List of Harry Potter books
 List of Murder, She Wrote novels
 List of Nancy Drew books
 List of Oz books
 List of Primeval books
 List of Puddle Lane books
 List of Railway Series Books
 List of Rainbow Magic books
 List of Savage Worlds books
 List of The Secret World of Alex Mack books
 List of Selby books
 List of Shadowrun books
 List of Space: 1999 books
 List of Star Wars books
 List of Stargate books
 List of Sweet Valley University Books
 List of Thoroughbred novels
 List of Tugs books
 List of X-Files books

Lists of manuscripts

 List of manuscripts
 List of Glagolitic manuscripts
 List of illuminated manuscripts
 List of Hiberno-Saxon illustrated manuscripts
 List of New Testament papyri
 List of New Testament uncials
 List of codices
 List of National Treasures of Japan (writings: Japanese books)
 List of Tangut books

Mixed media lists
Lists that include books:

 List of fiction employing parallel universes
 List of cyberpunk works
 List of nuclear holocaust fiction
 List of steampunk works
 List of time travel in fiction
 List of works published posthumously
 List of television series made into books

Lists by setting

 List of fiction set in ancient Greece
 List of fiction set in ancient Rome and the Roman Empire
 List of fiction set in Berlin
 List of fiction set in Chicago
 List of fiction set in Crete
 List of fiction set in Geneva
 List of fiction set in New Orleans
 List of fiction set in New York City
 List of fiction set in Nottingham
 List of fiction set in Oregon
 List of fiction set in Pittsburgh
 List of fiction set in San Diego
 List of fiction set in Shanghai
 List of fiction set in South Africa
 List of fiction set in Stockholm
 List of fiction set in Toronto

See also

 List of children's literature authors includes their best known works
 List of young adult writers includes their best known works
 List of libraries
 List of literary awards

Other lists

 Lists of banned books
 Lists of bookstores
 Lists of important publications in science
 Lists of prohibited books
 Lists of writers
 Lists of The New York Times Fiction Best Sellers
 Lists of The New York Times Non-Fiction Best Sellers

Digital libraries

 Google Books
 HathiTrust
 Internet Archive
 Internet Public Library
 List of digital library projects
 Online Books Page
 Online public access catalogs
 Project Gutenberg
 Wikisource

Further reading
 
 1001 Books You Must Read Before You Die The 100 Most Influential Books Ever Written Science Fiction: The 100 Best Novels''